Jonathan Q. Arbuckle is a fictional character from the Garfield comic strip by Jim Davis. He also appears in the animated television series Garfield and Friends and The Garfield Show, two live-action/CGI feature films, and three fully CGI films.

Jon is the owner of Garfield, whom he is frequently yet unknowingly mocked by, and Odie. A cartoonist by trade, he is largely presented as a comical, bumbling geek who is socially oblivious, especially when it comes to women.

Development 
The character of Jon Arbuckle was originally envisioned by Jim Davis as an author surrogate and was the primary character of the comic strip Jon, created by Davis in 1976 and syndicated locally in the Indiana newspaper The Pendleton Times. Jon featured Jon Arbuckle alongside his pet cat, Garfield, and a dog named "Spot", who would eventually evolve into Odie. Davis eventually decided to replace Jon with Garfield as the main character, with the renamed Garfield strip achieving national syndication in 1978.

Fictional biography
Jon told Garfield that he was 29 years old in a December 23, 1980, strip. However, in the episode "T3000" of The Garfield Show, he is described as 22.

Jon may be of Italian origins since he has an Italian ancestor whose name was Tony Arbuccli. 

He and his pets live in Jim Davis's hometown of Muncie, Indiana, according to the television specials Garfield Goes Hollywood and Happy Birthday, Garfield.

Occupation and hobbies 
In the first strip, Jon is presented as a cartoonist. Garfield and Friends also shows him several times as a cartoonist. In The Garfield Show, his occupation is a cartoonist. Also, in the strip from May 2, 2010, Liz tells her parents Jon is a cartoonist. Jon was also seen doing his work briefly in the August 2, 2015, strip.

He can play accordion, bagpipes, guitar, banjo, and bongos and sing, although his musical skills are not the greatest.

Family 
Jon was raised on a farm and occasionally visits his mother, father, paternal grandmother, and brother Doc Boy, who live on the farm.

Jon lives with Garfield and Odie, his pets.

Jon acquired Garfield at a pet shop.

Jon acquired Odie when Lyman, an old friend of his (and Odie's original owner), moved in with him and Garfield. After a few years, Lyman disappeared from the strip, never to be heard from again. The book Twenty Years and Still Kicking, which marked Garfield's twentieth year, included parodies of how Lyman left, such as "Had lunch with Jimmy Hoffa and then...". Lyman does appear in an episode of The Garfield Show, during which Jon sets out to look for him. Odie goes back to Lyman but returns to Garfield at the end.

Personality 
Before he met Liz, Jon consistently failed to date any woman. This has been partly due to ridiculous pick-up lines, lack of social skills, his entire wardrobe of incredibly weird, flashy outfits, and his general awkwardness. A consistent running gag is Garfield coming back from a New Year's Eve party and asking how a solitary Jon enjoyed his TV movie and microwave popcorn. Every Friday night, he would invite Garfield to undertake in his Friday night festivities instead of inviting whichever woman he was trying to hook up with. Otherwise, he would solely stare at his phone, desperately waiting in vain for a woman to call him. Jon's oddness and horrible fashion sense has often been the subject of teasing or outright mockery, usually from Garfield, as one of the major running gags in the series.

Jon has a longstanding crush on Garfield's veterinarian, Dr. Liz Wilson. Although she has a deadpan, sardonic persona, she finds Jon's outlandish and goofball behavior endearing on occasion. Jon often attempts to ask her out on a date but rarely succeeds, usually due to his lack of fashion sense, with Garfield making fun of his failure as a result; however, in an extended story arc from June 20 to July 29, 2006, Liz finally admitted she was in love with him and became his girlfriend from that point on. As early as 1982, Davis had suggested he would eventually bring Jon and Liz together as a couple.

Despite his somewhat timid and honest nature, Jon is sometimes shown to be quite assertive on Garfield and Friends. Additionally, he shows a tendency to be a miser, as Garfield mentions how Jon passes out seeing the rates on a parking meter.

Characterisation
Many of Jon's character traits are shared with his author Jim Davis, who was likewise a cartoonist, raised on a farm and born on July 28.

Reception 
Jon Arbuckle was voted number one on the Best Week Ever blog's list of "The Most Depressed Comic Book Characters".

Other media

 Jon's first animated appearance was in the 1980 CBS special, The Fantastic Funnies, when he was voiced by Thom Huge. Jon was voiced by Sandy Kenyon in the first animated television special (Here Comes Garfield), before Huge returned to the character in all later specials and in Garfield and Friends. Breckin Meyer portrayed Jon in the live-action/computer animated films Garfield: The Movie and Garfield: A Tail of Two Kitties. In Garfield Gets Real, Garfield's Fun Fest and Garfield's Pet Force, he was voiced by Wally Wingert. Wally also provides Jon's voice for The Garfield Show. Nicholas Hoult will provide Jon’s voice in the upcoming 2024 film.
 Similarly, Garfield Minus Garfield removes all the other characters completely and simply features Jon talking to himself. Fans connected with Jon's "loneliness and desperation" and found his "crazy antics" humorous; Jim Davis himself called Dan Walsh's (the author of Garfield Minus Garfield) strips an "inspired thing to do" and said that "some of the strips work better than the originals".
 An Arbuckle Thanksgiving and An Arbuckle Christmas have taken the two holiday video specials and digitally removed Garfield and Odie, leaving Jon as the lead.

References

Further sources

Garfield characters
Fictional cartoonists
Fictional characters from Indiana
Comics characters introduced in 1978
Internet memes
Male characters in comics
Male characters in animation

hu:Garfield#Jon Arbuckle